Boulenger's blind snake (Myriopholis macrura) is a species of snake in the family Leptotyphlopidae.

References

Myriopholis
Reptiles described in 1903
Taxobox binomials not recognized by IUCN